Kamigoto Airport  is a public aerodrome located on Kashiragashima Island (頭ヶ島), a smaller bridge-linked island just off the far east coast of Nakadorijima in the Gotō Islands, Nagasaki Prefecture, Japan. The terminal was renovated in July 2015 and the airport remains active for emergency medical shuttles, but commercial passenger routes have been suspended for several years. Given the airport's lack of traffic and its unusually remote location, the runway has been used occasionally as a venue for 'dark sky' appreciation tours with tourists lying on the runway and staring at the cosmos above.

History
The airport opened in April 1981 (Showa 56) with a 800m long, 25m wide landing strip built along the entire north–south flattened top of Kashiragashima. Nagasaki Airways, rebranded after March 2001 as Oriental Air Bridge, operated small passenger planes to Fukuoka Airport (until March 2004) and to Nagasaki Airport (until March 2006). By this time, new fast ferry services, combined with a falling island populations and the ever unreliable weather conditions (strong winds often causing cancellations), led to the suspension of commercial passenger flights. The nearest active airport is Goto-Fukue Airport which continue to serve the Island.

References

Airports in Japan
Transport in Nagasaki Prefecture
Buildings and structures in Nagasaki Prefecture